Squamipalpis is a genus of moths of the family Noctuidae first described by George Thomas Bethune-Baker in 1908.

Selected species
Squamipalpis melanostalus (Rothschild, 1920) 
Squamipalpis pantoea (Turner, 1908)
Squamipalpis subnubila (Leech, 1900)
Squamipalpis unilineata Bethune-Baker, 1908

References

Herminiinae